Teresa Nzola Meso Ba (born 30 November 1983, in Luanda) is an Angolan-French triple jumper.

Biography
She formerly represented Angola, but switched to France in 2003. Before this she set an Angolan triple jump record of 13.49 metres, which still stands.

Nzola Meso Ba finished ninth at the 2006 European Championships. At the 2007 European Indoor Championships, she finished third in a new French indoor record and personal best jump of 14.49 metres. Her personal best jump before the event was 14.07 metres, achieved in 2006.

She then competed at the 2007 World Championships, the 2008 World Indoor Championships and the 2008 Olympic Games without reaching the final. She improved her personal best to 14.69 metres in June 2007 in Munich.

Competition record

References

External links

1983 births
Living people
Sportspeople from Luanda
French female triple jumpers
Angolan female triple jumpers
Olympic athletes of France
Athletes (track and field) at the 2008 Summer Olympics
Mediterranean Games silver medalists for France
Mediterranean Games medalists in athletics
Athletes (track and field) at the 2009 Mediterranean Games
Athletes (track and field) at the 2013 Mediterranean Games
World Athletics Championships athletes for France
French people of Angolan descent